Lignières-la-Carelle is a former commune in the Sarthe department in the region of Pays de la Loire in north-western France. In 2015 it became part of Villeneuve-en-Perseigne, of which it is a delegated commune. Its population was 375 in 2019. As of 2012, there were 162 dwellings in the commune, of which 151 main residences.

See also
Communes of the Sarthe department

References

Former communes of Sarthe